HMS P33 was a Royal Navy U-class submarine built by Vickers-Armstrong at Barrow-in-Furness.

Commanded throughout her entire career by Lieutenant R.D. Whiteway-Wilkinson, the submarine was attached to the 10th Submarine Flotilla based at Malta. On 15 July 1941, the submarine sunk the 5,300 ton motor-vessel Barbarigo south of Punta Sciaccazza, Pantelleria, part of a small Italian convoy.

The submarine departed on her final patrol on 6 August 1941 from Malta to patrol off Sicily to intercept an Italian convoy heading towards Libya. Her sister boat P32, which was attacking the same convoy along with HMS Unique, reported hearing a prolonged depth charge attack on 18 August and subsequently attempted unsuccessfully to contact P33. P32 was herself sunk later that day. P33 became overdue on 20 August and was almost certainly have been sunk in this attack. It is, however, possible that she was sunk by the  near Pantelleria on 23 August. Lost aboard P33 was Lieutenant Richard Cunningham, the son of Vice Admiral John Cunningham, who would later become First Sea Lord.

References 
 
 
 
 
 

 

British U-class submarines
Ships built in Barrow-in-Furness
1941 ships
World War II submarines of the United Kingdom
Lost submarines of the United Kingdom
World War II shipwrecks in the Mediterranean Sea
Maritime incidents in August 1941
Missing submarines of World War II